Axel's Magic Hammer is a platform game developed by Core Design and published by Gremlin Graphics in 1989. The game was released for the Amiga and Atari ST.

References

External links
Axel's Magic Hammer at Lemon Amiga
Axel's Magic Hammer at Atari Mania

1989 video games
Amiga games
Atari ST games
Core Design games
Gremlin Interactive games
Video games scored by Ben Daglish
Video games developed in the United Kingdom